In algebraic geometry, the twisted Edwards curves are plane models of elliptic curves, a generalisation of Edwards curves introduced by Bernstein, Birkner, Joye, Lange and Peters in 2008. The curve set is named after mathematician Harold M. Edwards. Elliptic curves are important in public key cryptography and twisted Edwards curves are at the heart of an electronic signature scheme called EdDSA that offers high performance while avoiding security problems that have surfaced in other digital signature schemes.

Definition
Each twisted Edwards curve is a twist of an Edwards curve.

 

The special case  is untwisted, because the curve reduces to an ordinary Edwards curve.

Every twisted Edwards curve is birationally equivalent to an elliptic curve in Montgomery form and vice versa.

Group law

As for all elliptic curves, also for the twisted Edwards curve, it is possible to do some operations between its points, such as adding two of them or doubling (or tripling) one. The results of these operations are always points that belong to the curve itself. In the following sections some formulas are given to obtain the coordinates of a point resulted from an addition between two other points (addition), or the coordinates of point resulted from a doubling of a single point on a curve.

Addition on twisted Edwards curves
Let  be a field with characteristic different from 2.
Let  and  be points on the twisted Edwards curve. The  equation of twisted Edwards curve is written as;

 EE,a,d: .

The sum of these points  on EE,a,d is:

 

These formulas also work for doubling.

Example of addition

Given the following twisted Edwards curve with a = 3 and d = 2:

 

it is possible to add the points  and  using the formula given above. The result is a point P3 that has coordinates:

Doubling on twisted Edwards curves
Doubling can be performed with exactly the same formula as addition.
Doubling of a point  on the curve Ea,d is:

where

 

Denominators in doubling are simplified using the curve equation . This reduces the power from 4 to 2 and allows for more efficient computation.

Example of doubling

Considering the same twisted Edwards curve given in the previous example, with a=3 and d=2, it is possible to double the point . The point 2P1 obtained using the formula above has the following coordinates:

 

 

It is easy to see, with some little computations, that the point  belongs to the curve .

Extended coordinates

There is another kind of coordinate system with which a point in the twisted Edwards curves can be represented.

The coordinates of the point (X:Y:Z:T) are called the extended twisted Edwards coordinates. The identity element is represented by (0:1:1:0). The negative of a point is (−X:Y:Z:−T).

Inverted twisted Edwards coordinates

The coordinates of the point   are called the inverted twisted Edwards coordinates on the curve
Bernstein and Lange introduced these inverted coordinates, for the case a=1 and observed that the coordinates save time in addition.

Projective twisted Edwards coordinates

The equation for the projective twisted Edwards curve is given as:
 For Z1 ≠ 0 the point (X1:Y1:Z1) represents the affine point (x1 = X1/Z1, y1 = Y1/Z1) on EE,a,d.

Expressing an elliptic curve in twisted Edwards form saves time in arithmetic, even when the same curve can be expressed in the Edwards form.

Addition in projective twisted curves

The addition on a projective twisted Edwards curve is given by

(X3:Y3:Z3) = (X1:Y1:Z1) + (X2:Y2:Z2)

and costs 10Multiplications + 1Squaring + 2D + 7 additions, where the 2D are one multiplication by a and one by d.

Algorithm

A = Z1 · Z2,
B = A2
C = X1 · X2
D = Y1 · Y2
E = dC · D
F = B − E
G = B + E
X3 = A · F((X1 + Y1) · (X2 + Y2) − C − D)
Y3 = A · G · (D − aC)
Z3 = F · G

Doubling on projective twisted curves

Doubling on the projective twisted curve is given by

(X3:Y3:Z3) = 2(X1:Y1:Z1).

This costs 3Multiplications + 4Squarings + 1D + 7additions, where 1D is a multiplication by a.

Algorithm

B = (X1 + Y1)2
C = X12
D = Y12
E = aC
F = E + D
H = Z12
J = F − 2H
X3 = (B − C − D).J
Y3 = F · (E − D)
Z3 = F · J

See also

 EdDSA
 For more information about the running time required in a specific case, see Table of costs of operations in elliptic curves.

Notes

References

External links
 http://hyperelliptic.org/EFD/g1p/index.html
 http://hyperelliptic.org/EFD/g1p/auto-twisted.html
 The Ed25519 algorithm: http://ed25519.cr.yp.to/

Elliptic curves
Elliptic curve cryptography